Padma Kumta or Padma Kumata was an Indian actress in the Kannada film industry. Some of the notable films of Padma Kumta as an actress include Chomana Dudi (1975), Bayalu Daari (1976), Phalitamsha (1976), Avasthe (1987) and Arivu (2017). She died of cardiac arrest.

Awards

Career
Padma Kumta has been part of more than thirty movies, and many serials/soaps in Kannada, including Manthana.

Selected filmography

Chomana Dudi (1975)
Phalithamsha (1976)
Bayalu Daari (1977)
Shiva Mecchida Kannappa (1988)
Sri Venkateshwara Mahime (1988)
Devatha Manushya (1988)
Sindhoora Thilaka (1992)
Bevu Bella (1993)
Nan Hendthi Chennagidale (2000)

See also

List of people from Karnataka
Cinema of Karnataka
List of Indian film actresses
Cinema of India

References

External links

Actresses in Kannada cinema
Kannada people
Actresses from Karnataka
Actresses from Bangalore
Indian film actresses
21st-century Indian actresses
Actresses in Kannada television
2017 deaths